Marcinkiewicz is a Polish family name of patronymic origin, meaning "son of Marcin (Martin)". People named Marcinkiewicz include:

 Iwona Marcinkiewicz (born 1975), Polish archer
 Józef Marcinkiewicz (1910–1940), Polish mathematician, author of the Marcinkiewicz theorem
 Kazimierz Marcinkiewicz (born 1959), former prime minister of Poland
 Maxim Martsinkevich (1984–2020), Russian neo-Nazi activist
 Mike Marcinkiewicz (born 1966), Canadian professional ice hockey player
 Wincenty Dunin-Marcinkiewicz, or Vintsent Dunin-Martsinkyevich (1808–1884), Belarusian–Polish writer and social activist

Polish-language surnames